Martín Alund (born 26 December 1985) is a retired Argentine professional tennis player. He reached the semifinals of the 2013 Brasil Open; has won seven ATP Challenger events in doubles; and achieved a career-high singles ranking of World No. 84 in March 2013.

Tennis career

Juniors
As a junior, Alund reached as high as No. 45 in the world singles rankings in March 2003 (and No. 62 in doubles the same year). He gained victories over promising junior prospects such as Eduardo Schwank, Alex Kuznetsov and Scoville Jenkins.

Pro tour

2013
As a lucky loser, Alund reached the semifinals of the 2013 Brasil Open, defeating World No. 25 Jérémy Chardy (fresh off of his career-best Australian Open quarterfinal run) and experienced claycourter Filippo Volandri en route. In the semis he valiantly took a set off top seed Rafael Nadal before losing in 3 sets.

In Houston a few weeks later, Alund defeated former World No. 1 and multiple grand slam champion Lleyton Hewitt.

Alund gained direct entry into both the French Open and Wimbledon, winning a set against World No. 4 David Ferrer in the first round of the latter before eventually losing in four sets. In preparation for the grass courts, he won the Liverpool International exhibition tournament, etching his name alongside esteemed former champions Marat Safin, Ivan Ljubičić and Fernando González.

Together with João Souza, Alund reached the quarterfinals of the men's doubles at Båstad.

2014
After qualifying for both Viña del Mar and Buenos Aires, Alund defeated clay specialist Albert Ramos in straights and took a set off both World No. 18 Nicolas Almagro and No. 46 Robin Haase.

Retirement
After a year and a half of injuries, Alund announced he had decided to retire from the pro tour, lending his world class skills to the coaching team at Advantage Tennis in New Jersey.

Playing style
Alund is a natural claycourter, though intersperses his defensive skills with clean hitting, a powerful first serve and deft dropshots.

Career finals

Challenger singles: 3 (0–3)

References

External links
 
 

Argentine male tennis players
Argentine people of Swedish descent
Sportspeople from Mendoza, Argentina
1985 births
Living people
South American Games bronze medalists for Argentina
South American Games medalists in tennis
Competitors at the 2002 South American Games